Enzo Restuccia (19 March 1941 – 5 December 2021) was an Italian drummer.

References

External links
 
 
 

1941 births
2021 deaths
Italian drummers
Pop musicians
Jazz musicians
Jazz drummers
Musicians from Naples